Padungan is a main city area of Kuching, Sarawak, Malaysia. The Kuching South City Council (MBKS) headquarters is located there.

Kuching